Daniel O'Callaghan was an Irish Labour Party politician. He was elected as a Labour Party Teachta Dála (TD) to the 3rd Dáil at the 1922 general election for the Wexford constituency. He lost his seat at the 1923 general election.

References

Year of birth missing
Year of death missing
Labour Party (Ireland) TDs
Members of the 3rd Dáil
Politicians from County Wexford